The Camden Police Department (CPD) was the primary civilian law enforcement agency in Camden, New Jersey, until it was dissolved on May 1, 2013, when the Camden County Police Department Metro Division took over full responsibility for policing the city of Camden.

Crime in Camden
 
Camden consistently ranked among the cities in the United States with the highest crime rate based on FBI statistics. In 2008, Camden had 2,333 violent crimes for every 100,000 residents, compared to the national rate of 455. Camden has been ranked America's "most dangerous city" in 2004, 2005, and 2009 by CQ Press, which ranks cities based on reported murder, rape, robbery, aggravated assault, burglary, and motor vehicle theft data.

History

1996 audit
In 1996, public criticism of mismanagement and corruption in the Camden Police Department, coupled with high crime rates led state and city administrations to order an audit. The department had previously been audited in 1962, 1982, and 1986. The audit found that Camden had a higher rate of index crimes than any other major city in New Jersey, with a domestic violence incident rate nearly three times the national average. In their investigation, the audit team reported that information provided by the Camden police was often inconsistent or incomplete. The final report included 75 recommendations and was released in March 1996. In the two years after the audit, 90% of the recommendations had been implemented and the city had saved over $500,000.

Drug enforcement corruption probe
In 2010, an ongoing federal investigation alleges that former Camden Police Officer Kevin Parry and four other officers planted drugs during illegal searches, pocketed the money, and framed suspects. Kevin Parry has pleaded guilty in the case, admitting a role in charges being overturned or dismissed in 185 drug cases. Lawsuit settlements totaling $3.5 million were paid to 88 victims. Three other Camden officers, Jason Stetser, Antonio Figaro, and Dan Morris also pleaded guilty and were sentenced to prison over the scandal.

Budget shortfall
In 2011, the total tax revenue for the city of Camden was $24 million while the budget for the Camden police was $65 million.

In January 2011, the department laid off 168 of the department's 370 officers when contract negotiations stalled and the city was facing a budget shortfall. Camden experienced a spike in homicides, and the city police department wanted to hire more patrol officers but couldn't afford to partly due to generous union contracts. According to CNN the corruption had also "rendered the existing agency unfixable." On August 2, 2011, the City of Camden and Camden County announced that the city police department would be disbanded in favor of a new county police force. Well-known law enforcement executive John Timoney was retained to develop an organizational and functional plan for the department.

The creation of the county police force in place of the city force was expected to save between $14 and $16 million annually out of the $60 million budget of the city police department. Unlike the city police department it replaced, the new "county" department was not initially unionized. Savings were expected to come from reducing the fringe benefits that had been required under the city's union contract.

The move was endorsed by the Mayor of Camden, Dana Redd, who indicated that the new police department would be more cost-effective, and that the high absentee rate of city officers had affected the former department's ability to keep the city safe.  An official of the Camden Fraternal Order of Police, which represented city police officers, described the plan as "union busting" and called it "a recipe for disaster" that would replace experienced city officers with new personnel unfamiliar with the city. A community group known as the Citizens' Community Committee for Public Safety, along with the Camden Fraternal Order of Police, criticized the plan as being political, not practical. The mayor's political opponents also criticized the disbandment of the city's department.

Disbandment

On August 2, 2012, the city of Camden and Camden County announced that the department would be disbanded in favor of a new county police department, the Camden County Police Department. The new department took over for the Camden Police Department on May 1, 2013. Like other county-wide police forces in the nation, this new department will be available to any other municipality in the county who wishes to disband its police forces and join the county police district.

Special Operations squad
The Special Operations squad coordinated specialized resources to aid police in daily field activities and special occurrences. The CPD operated the following forces:

K-9 Unit
S.W.A.T. team
Special Victims Unit
Domestic Violence Unit
Auto Squad
Detective Bureau
HIDTA
Anti-Crime Partnership
Marine Bureau
Mounted Horse Unit
Smash Team Unit
Tactical Negotiations Unit (TNT)
Patrol Division North
Patrol Bureau South
Patrol Unit Central

References

External links
Official website

Camden, New Jersey
2013 disestablishments in New Jersey
Government agencies disestablished in 2013
Municipal police departments of New Jersey